Taqi Kandi may refer to:
 Taqi Kandi, Ardabil
 Taqi Kandi, Parsabad, Ardabil Province
 Taqi Kandi, East Azerbaijan
 Taqi Kandi, West Azerbaijan
 Taqi Kandi, Zanjan